Pažaislis is a  neighborhood ("territory") of Kaunas, Lithuania, within its Petrašiūnai eldership. It includes the Pažaislis Monastery.

History
The name Pažaislis is Lithuanization of Polish name , literally meaning "by Zajście", i.e. located at the mouth of the Zajście stream, a tributary of Neman.

Originally, there were two so named places in the same area. One of them was a folwark owned by Krzysztof Zygmunt Pac. By the end of the 19th century it had 6 households with some 50–60 persons. Another was a manor across Neman. Originally it was owned by the Oborski family and Pac bought it from a Samuel Jan Oborski in 1664. Eventually it grew into the monastery. The same year Pac transferred the ownership of the whole Pożajście  to Camaldolese and henceforth the place was known as Mons Pacis. In 1667 Pac further transfers to Camaldolese  several other manors ( Duszmiany, Jackówek, etc.). 

Pažaislis was incorporated into Kaunas in 1946.

A significant part of the neighborhood is occupied by the park named . It is part of the Kauno Marios Regional Park.

It "succeeded" the original Pažaislis oak, which was dying and removed from the list of natural monuments. 

During the construction of the Kaunas Reservoir nearly all its territory northeast of the monastery was flooded. During the flooding the Peace Mountain naturally formed a peninsula, on which the monastery resides now.

Gallery

References

Neighbourhoods of Kaunas
Former populated places in Lithuania